Canna glauca  is a species of the Canna genus, a member of the family Cannaceae. It is commonly known as water canna or Louisiana canna. It is native to the wetlands of tropical America and was introduced to England in 1730. It is also reportedly naturalized in Sri Lanka, Thailand, Vietnam, Java and the Philippines.

Description 
It has narrow, blue-green (glaucous) leaves, atop of which sit its large, delicate, and pale yellow flowers.

Distribution and habitat 
C. glauca is native to the southeastern and south-central United States (Texas, Florida, Louisiana and South Carolina) as well as Mexico, Central America, South America and the West Indies. It is an aquatic species, growing as a marginal plant in up to about 15 cm of still or slow-moving water.

Taxonomy
Nobuyuki Tanaka, one of the leading researchers on genus Canna, recognises two varieties of Canna glauca: Canna glauca var. glauca and Canna glauca var. siamensis (Kraenzl) N.Tanaka. The latter variety widespread in South and Southeast Asia, where it is supposed to have differentiated within the past few centuries.

Cultivation
The species prefers light (sandy), medium (loamy) and heavy (clay) soils and requires well-drained soil. The preferred soil is acid, neutral and basic (alkaline). It cannot grow in the shade and requires moist soil. It is hardy to zone 10 and is frost tender. In the north latitudes it is in flower from August to October, and the seeds ripen in October.

Gallery

Notes

External links
 Royal Botanic Gardens, Kew: New Views: Language of Flowers: Canna glauca
 PRINCE, LINDA M.* and W. JOHN KRESS. Smithsonian Institution, NMNH - Botany, MRC-166, Washington, DC 20560-0166. - Species boundaries in Canna (Cannaceae): evidence from nuclear ITS DNA sequence data.

glauca
Plants described in 1753
Taxa named by Carl Linnaeus
Flora of North America
Flora of South America
Flora of Central America
Flora of the Caribbean
Crops originating from Uruguay
Flora without expected TNC conservation status